Tim Campbell (1939-2015) was a gay activist and newspaper publisher. Campbell was born in Leavenworth, Kansas and grew up in Texas. He earned his master's degree in French linguistics from the University of Texas and moved to teach at the University of Minnesota in 1972. In Minnesota, he reported for a short-lived newspaper, Positively Gay and went on to found GLC Voice, a newspaper from the Twin Cities gay and lesbian community which ran from 1979 to 1992. GLC Voice was distributed freely on college campuses, in gay bars, bookstores, and on the streets. Campbell was well known in Minnesota as a self-appointed spokesman for the gay community and often employed confrontational and spectacle tactics in his activism. For example, he once dressed as Lady Liberty to protest the Rev. Jerry Falwell and set fire in the Minneapolis Civil Rights Department to protest the handling of gay issues.

References 

1939 births
2015 deaths
20th-century American newspaper founders
American LGBT rights activists